The 1923 Hong Kong Sanitary Board election was supposed to be held on 12 April 1923 for an elected seat in the Sanitary Board of Hong Kong.

The election was held for the two of the elected seats in the board due to the expiry of term of C. G. Alabaster. Alabaster returned to the Board uncontested.

References

Hong Kong
1923 in Hong Kong
Sanitary
Uncontested elections
April 1923 events
1923 elections in the British Empire